Tributo a Soda Stereo Is a 2001 album tribute to the Argentinian rock band Soda Stereo.

Track listing
"Vitaminas - Genitallica"
"Un Millon De Años Luz - Jumbo"
"Zoom - Mœnia"
"Septimo Dia - Gandhi"
"La Cupula - Los Caballeros De La Quema"
"Juegos De Seduccion - Lucybell"
"Te Para Tres - Aterciopelados"
"Primavera Cero - La Gusana Ciega"
"Disco Eterno - Julieta Venegas"
"Camaleon - Control Machete"
"Persiana Americana - Atomica

External links
 

2001 albums
Tribute albums